The Multimark was a logo introduced by Canadian Pacific Railway on July 17, 1968, to identify each of its various operations.

The Multimark was created by the international marketing and design firm Lippincott and Margulies. It was composed of a circle representing global activities, a triangle representing motion or direction, and in contrast, a square (sometimes elongated into a rectangle) indicating stability. By the 1990s, the logo was sometimes referred to as the "Pac-Man logo" by railfans for its resemblance to the early video game character.

Industry changes 

The Multimark was gradually eliminated in the 1980s as the various components of Canadian Pacific Limited changed names. CP Air became Canadian Pacific Airlines and was later sold off. CP Hotels became Canadian Pacific Hotels and Resorts and much later sold off. CP Express & Transport went out of business due to deregulation. CP Telecommunications was merged into CNCP Telecommunications which soon went out of business due to the changing industry. (Unitel was then created to acquire what remained.) CP Ships became Canadian Pacific Ships and was finally sold off in 2005.  CP Rail became known as CP Rail System in January 1991, with the acquisition of the bankrupt American Delaware and Hudson Railway. The marketing name included Soo Line Railroad which had become 100% owned. (CPR had long had controlling interest in it).  

The use of the Multimark on CP Rail slowly faded away with no official announcement. September 1987 saw the first diesel to be repainted without it, a GP7 yard engine numbered 1684.

Legacy
While the two companies, other than owning the same ship (RMS Empress of Canada, later Mardi Gras) at different points of the ship's life, are completely unrelated, it has been said that Carnival Cruise Line's logo is a derivative of the Multimark, with the Multimark's edges being rounded out, and the colors changed to red, white and blue.

Colours 
Each operating division was assigned a different colour while taking on a new identity:

References

Canadian Pacific Railway
Commercial logos
Symbols introduced in 1968